John William Joseph Williams (2 September 1930 – 29 September 2012) was a Welsh-Canadian computer scientist best known for inventing in 1964 heapsort and the binary heap data structure. He was born in Chippenham, Wiltshire and spent the latter part of his career in Canada, moving to Kanata, Ottawa in 1972 and working for Bell-Northern Research and Nortel before retiring in 1995.

References

External links

1930 births
2012 deaths
British computer scientists
Canadian computer scientists
British emigrants to Canada